Tuva-Lisa is a 1992 children's novel by Swedish writers Anders Jacobsson and Sören Olsson. It was followed by two sequels. The novel was translated in Finnish by Tuula Kallioniemi.

The main character is Tuva-Lisa Johansson, a Swedish girl who is 12 years old (nearly 13). Her parents work in theater, and she has written her own plays for the stage and wants to become an actress. Her friend is Jessica.

Among the stage plays written by the character is Ett vemodigt tillstånd av tråkighet, depicting an old man reflecting on his life as a greengrocer.

Books

In other languages than Swedish
Finnish: Iida-Liisa

External links
 Soren-Anders.se - Tuva-Lisa

References 

Swedish children's novels
Swedish children's book series
Novels about writers
Works by Anders Jacobsson and Sören Olsson
Book series introduced in 1992